Weronika Wedler (born 17 July 1989 in Wrocław) is a Polish sprint athlete. She won several medals with the Polish 4 × 100 metres relay team.

Competition record

Personal bests
Outdoor
 100 metres – 11.35 (+2.0 m/s) (Sosnowiec 2011)
 200 metres – 23.21 (-0.4 m/s) (Bydgoszcz 2010)
Indoor
 60 metres – 7.38 (Spała 2010)
 200 metres – 23.58 (Sopot 2014)

References
 

1989 births
Living people
Polish female sprinters
Sportspeople from Wrocław
European Athletics Championships medalists
World Athletics Championships athletes for Poland
Universiade medalists in athletics (track and field)
Universiade bronze medalists for Poland
Medalists at the 2013 Summer Universiade